The Roman Catholic Diocese of Santisimo Salvador de Bayamo y Manzanillo (erected 9 December 1995) is a suffragan diocese of the Archdiocese of Santiago de Cuba.

Ordinaries

Dionisio Guillermo García Ibáñez (1995 - 2007), appointed Archbishop of Santiago de Cuba
Álvaro Julio Beyra Luarca (2007–present)

External links and references

Roman Catholic dioceses in Cuba
Christian organizations established in 1995
Roman Catholic dioceses and prelatures established in the 20th century
Roman Catholic Ecclesiastical Province of Santiago de Cuba